Peter Francis Williams is an amateur astronomer from New South Wales, Australia. He specializes in early detection of declines in R Coronae Borealis-type stars and the long-term monitoring of several southern Mira variables and eclipsing binary stars. He was the first person who detected the naked-eye Nova known as V382 Velorum in 1999 and seven years later he discovered the Nova Ophiuchi 2006. Both discoveries brought him the Nova/Supernova Award of the American Association of Variable Star Observers. In 2007 he received the Amateur Achievement Award of the Astronomical Society of the Pacific. He is a life member of the Sutherland Astronomical Society.

References

Living people
20th-century Australian astronomers
Amateur astronomers
21st-century Australian astronomers
Year of birth missing (living people)